Derephysia foliacea, the foliaceous lace bug, is a species of lace bug in the family Tingidae. It is found in Africa, Europe and Northern Asia (excluding China), and Southern Asia.

Subspecies
These two subspecies belong to the species Derephysia foliacea:
 Derephysia foliacea biroi Horváth, 1896
 Derephysia foliacea foliacea (Fallén, 1807)

References

Further reading

External links

 

Tingidae
Articles created by Qbugbot
Insects described in 1807
Taxa named by Carl Fredrik Fallén